
De Lindenhorst is a defunct restaurant in Valkenburg, Netherlands. It was a fine dining restaurant that was awarded one Michelin star in 1983 and retained that rating until 1993.

Head chef in the time of the Michelin star was Ida Kleijnen.

Owner Ida Kleijnen sold the restaurant in 1994 to her son Paul Keijdener. The same day, they learned the restaurant had lost its Michelin star.

See also
List of Michelin starred restaurants in the Netherlands

References

External links
  Picture Archive Valkenburg - Photo "Presentation Michelinstar to restaurant Lindenhorst"

Restaurants in the Netherlands
Michelin Guide starred restaurants in the Netherlands
Defunct restaurants in the Netherlands
Restaurants in Limburg (Netherlands)
Buildings and structures in Valkenburg aan de Geul